WCRC (95.7 FM) is a radio station licensed to Effingham, Illinois, United States.  The station is currently owned by Cromwell Radio Group, through licensee The Cromwell Group, Inc. of Illinois.  Its current format consists of country music.

References

External links
 

CRC